Never Dies the Dream is a 1949 novel by Margaret Landon. The books centers around India Severn, an upright missionary assisting the waifs of Bangkok. She comes to the aid of an American widow of a Siamese prince.

References

1949 novels